Fernando Rafael "Chito" Martínez Silva (born 8 June 1977) is a Venezuelan footballer who plays striker.

Career
Born in Puerto Ordaz, Martínez has spent most of his career playing in Venezuelan league with Minervén, Caracas, Táchira, Mineros, Trujillanos and Llaneros.

Martínez played for Russian Premier League side FC Uralan Elista during 2003, making him the first Venezuelan to play in the league.

In 2011, Martínez moved to the Canary Islands where he would play amateur football with UD Los Llanos and CD Atlético Paso in the Preferente de Tenerife.

References

External links
 

1977 births
Living people
People from Ciudad Guayana
Venezuelan footballers
Association football forwards
Minervén S.C. players
Estudiantes de Mérida players
A.C.C.D. Mineros de Guayana players
FC Elista players
Caracas FC players
Deportivo Táchira F.C. players
Trujillanos FC players
Carabobo F.C. players
Llaneros de Guanare players
Venezuelan expatriate footballers
Expatriate footballers in Russia
Russian Premier League players
Venezuelan expatriate sportspeople in Russia